Júlio César de Souza Santos or simply Júlio César (born 27 October 1984 in São Paulo, São Paulo) is a Brazilian former footballer who played as a goalkeeper.

Career

Early career
Born in São Paulo, Júlio César started playing football as a child on the streets of the Tucuruvi neighborhood. By the age of 9, he played with the children's teams at the local Clube de Campo Associação Atlética Guapira. After a friendly match against Corinthians in the age of 15, Júlio was invited by a scout to train at their youth team, with which he won the 2004 and 2005 editions of the Copa São Paulo de Futebol Júnior.

Professional career
After Corinthians' main goalkeeper, Fábio Costa was barred by the coach Daniel Passarella and his immediate reserve Tiago suffered 5 goals in a derby match against São Paulo FC, Júlio Cesar's chances began to rise. After another loss with Tiago on the squad and Daniel Passarella's firing, Júlio César made his debut in a match against Figueirense from Santa Catarina. Corinthians won by two goals to one, and Júlio César was sent to the bench again, as he was replaced with Marcelo Marinho, also from the youth team. That would be the only appearance from Júlio César in the 2005 season, which was won by Corinthians in controversial fashion.

The departure of Fábio Costa in 2006 caused a quick turnaround of goalkeepers in the team that would only end in 2008, such as Silvio Luiz, Johnny Herrera, and Bruno, who did not play for the team, Jean, who soon was barred from the main team, and Felipe. Júlio César only had a chance in 2008, after Marcelo's departure and Felipe's injury. Playing in matches for the Campeonato Paulista, Júlio earned a place as the main goalkeeper after Felipe failed in the Copa do Brasil, losing it yet again after Felipe rejoined the team, despite playing well. After Felipe's troubled departure from Corinthians, Júlio Cesar finally cemented his place as a main goalkeeper. Corinthians hired Paraguay national football team's Aldo Bobadilla for the goalkeeping position, who did not play for the team.

After poor showings in the 2011 Campeonato Paulista, Corinthians announced the arrival of a new goalkeeper, Renan from Avaí Futebol Clube. In a match against Botafogo, Júlio César suffered a compound fracture in his left pinky finger, but he soldiered on, as Corinthians had already made its 3 substitutions for the game. Renan, however, did not make good use of Júlio César's absence, playing poorly and losing his position to the third keeper, Danilo Fernandes, until Júlio was completely recovered and back to his goalkeeping duties.

On 12 October 2011, Júlio César played his 100th match for Corinthians, losing by 2 goals against Botafogo.

After overcoming harsh criticism from the fans, Júlio César finished 2011 as the absolute main goalkeeper for the team, helping Corinthians win the 2011 Campeonato Brasileiro.

In 2012, however, Júlio César's main team status was in danger. During the 2012 Campeonato Paulista, Júlio was criticized by his performances. The elimination against the Campinas squad AA Ponte Preta in the quarter finals, in which Júlio had committed "grotesque failings", suffering three goals against a weaker team caused manager Tite to replace him with the former goalkeeper of PSV Eindhoven, Cássio. Cássio did not disappoint, and was the main goalkeeper during Corinthians' unbeaten Libertadores campaign. Júlio was briefly linked with São Paulo squad Portuguesa, but the move did not materialize.

In July 2014 Júlio César left Corinthians for the first time, signing on loan for Náutico to get first team football. The transfer was made permanent at the end of the year, when his Corinthians contract expired.

At the end of 2016, after three seasons with Náutico, the player signed for Santa Cruz, in what was effectively a swap arrangement for Tiago Cardoso. After a year he signed with Red Bull Brasil and was part of the team that transitioned to Red Bull Bragantino following the merger with Clube Atlético Bragantino.

Honours

Club
Corinthians
Copa São Paulo de Futebol Júnior: 2004, 2005
Campeonato Brasileiro Série A: 2005, 2011
Campeonato Brasileiro Série B: 2008
Campeonato Paulista: 2009 2013
Copa do Brasil: 2009
Copa Libertadores: 2012
FIFA Club World Cup: 2012
Recopa Sudamericana: 2013

Personal life
Júlio César is an Evangelical, converting in 2005.

Career statistics

Club

References

External links
Official website
Profile at Globo Esporte's Futpedia

1984 births
Living people
Footballers from São Paulo
Brazilian footballers
Association football goalkeepers
Sport Club Corinthians Paulista players
Clube Náutico Capibaribe players
Santa Cruz Futebol Clube players
Red Bull Brasil players
Red Bull Bragantino players
Campeonato Brasileiro Série A players
Campeonato Brasileiro Série B players
Brazilian evangelicals
Converts to evangelical Christianity